Oramel Hinckley Simpson (March 20, 1870 – November 17, 1932) was an American politician from the U.S. state of Louisiana. He became the 39th Governor of Louisiana in 1926, upon the death of his predecessor, Henry L. Fuqua. He was defeatedhe ran third in the critical Democratic primaryin his bid for a full term in 1928 by the legendary Huey Pierce Long Jr., of Winnfield, the seat of Winn Parish.

Simpson was born in Washington, a small town in St. Landry Parish in south Louisiana to Samuel F. Simpson and the former Mary Esther Beer. He was educated at Centenary College, then in Jackson in East Feliciana Parish but later relocated to Shreveport, the seat of Caddo Parish. One of Simpson's classmates at Centenary in the 1890 graduating class was later State Senator Thomas Wafer Fuller, who was thereafter the Webster Parish school superintendent.

Simpson thereafter attended the Tulane University Law School in New Orleans. He was an attorney in New Orleans from 1893–1899, when he briefly took the position of warrant clerk at the United States Mint  there. In 1899, he married Louise Ernestine Pichet of New Orleans. They had no children.

Thereafter, Simpson was the assistant secretary of the state Senate from 1900 until 1908, when he became secretary of the Senate, a post that he retained until his election as lieutenant governor in 1924. He was also the secretary of the Louisiana constitutional convention of 1921.

During his brief term as governor, Simpson opposed a toll bridge across the eastern portion of Lake Pontchartrain which was being built to connect New Orleans and Slidell in St. Tammany Parish. Simpson proposed instead that a free bridge to be built from Chef Menteur, but influential figures in New Orleans worked to authorize the toll bridge despite Simpson's objections. However, Simpson was able to start a free ferry service, which reduced the revenue to the toll bridge. The Speaker of the Louisiana House of Representatives during the Simpson administration was William Clark Hughes of Bossier Parish in northwestern Louisiana.

The Ku Klux Klan reemerged during Simpson's term of office. Legislation was passed to outlaw hoods, masks, and robes excepting those worn during Mardi Gras and at masked balls or parties.

The great flood in 1927 forced Simpson to order a "downriver cut" of the levee to protect New Orleans. Afterwards, the affected states of Louisiana, Arkansas, and Mississippi formed a tri-state flood control commission and worked together to secure federal aid for flood prevention. Property owners from the downriver parishes were compensated by the state for losses resulting from the levee cut.

Two major candidates, Simpson and U.S. Representative Riley J. Wilson of Louisiana's 8th congressional district (Winn Parish), opposed Huey Long's election as governor. Long won by the largest margin in Louisiana Democratic primary history up until that time, 126,842 votes, compared to 81,747 for Wilson and 80,326 for Simpson.

After his governorship, Simpson returned briefly in 1932 to his former position as secretary of the state senate.

Simpson died of a heart seizure in New Orleans some two weeks after the election of Franklin D. Roosevelt as president. He was Methodist. He is interred at Greenwood Cemetery, New Orleans.

Notes

References

 Davis, Edwin Adams (1961). Louisiana: The Pelican State. Baton Rouge: Louisiana State University Press. .
 "Oramel Hinckley Simpson," A Dictionary of Louisiana Biography, Vol. II (1988), pp. 744–745
 Robert Sobel and John Raimo, eds., Biographical Directory of the Governors of the United States, 1789–1978, Vol. 2 (1978)

External links
 State of Louisiana – Biography
 Cemetery Memorial by La-Cemeteries

Democratic Party governors of Louisiana
1870 births
1932 deaths
Tulane University alumni
Lieutenant Governors of Louisiana
Methodists from Louisiana
Louisiana lawyers
People from Washington, Louisiana
Centenary College of Louisiana alumni
Tulane University Law School alumni
Huey Long